FabricLive.05 is a DJ mix compilation album by Howie B, as part of the FabricLive Mix Series.

Track listing

References

External links
Fabric: FabricLive.05
Allmusic: [ FabricLive.04 review]
Resident Advisor: FabricLive.04 review

Howie B albums
Albums produced by Howie B
2002 compilation albums